The close-mid central rounded vowel, or high-mid central rounded vowel, is a type of vowel sound.

The character ɵ has been used in several Latin-derived alphabets such as the one for Yañalif but then denotes a sound that is different from that of the IPA. The character is homographic with Cyrillic Ө.

This sound rarely contrasts with the near-close front rounded vowel and so is sometimes transcribed with the symbol  (the symbol for the near-close front rounded vowel)

Close-mid central protruded vowel 
As there is no dedicated diacritic for protrusion in the IPA, symbol for the close central rounded vowel with an old diacritic for labialization, can be used as an ad hoc symbol  for the close central protruded vowel.

Features

Occurrence 
Because central rounded vowels are assumed to have protrusion, and few descriptions cover the distinction, some of the following may actually have compression.

Close-mid central compressed vowel 

As there is no official diacritic for compression in the IPA, the centering diacritic is used with the front rounded vowel , which is normally compressed.

Features

Occurrence

See also 
 Index of phonetics articles

Notes

References 

 
 
 
 
 
 

 
 
 
 
 
 
 
 
 
 
 
 
 
 
 
 
 
 
 
 
 
  A summary of the presentation can be found here.

External links
 

Close-mid vowels
Central vowels
Rounded vowels